"Bed" is a song by American singer J. Holiday serving as the second single for his debut studio album, Back of My Lac'. It was released by Capitol Records as the album's second single on June 19, 2007. It was written by Carlos "Los Da Mystro" McKinney and fellow singer Terius "The-Dream" Nash.

Chart performance 
"Bed" debuted on the U.S. Billboard Hot 100 in the issue week of August 4, 2007 at number 89 and has peaked at number 5. It was number 1 on the Hot R&B/Hip-Hop Songs for five weeks in a row. The single has also debuted on BET's 106 & Park countdown at number 9 on Tuesday July 31, 2007. On Wednesday, August 15, 2007, "Bed" hit number one on its 11th day on the countdown. This song was No. 70 on Rolling Stones list of the 100 Best Songs of 2007. The video for "Bed" was ranked the No. 11 video of 2007 on BET: Notarized.

Live performances  
On August 17, 2007, Holiday gave his first televised performance of the song on BET's 106 & Park. "Bed" was also performed on Showtime at the Apollo along with the single "Suffocate".

Music video 
The music video for "Bed" was directed by Jonathan Mannion. The video starts with J. Holiday in his tour bus. Not long after he goes to a motel where he is singing the first verse. There are scenes of the woman that he is singing about though she is not present with him. The first verse also consists of a scene of Holiday singing on a brown wall. Eventually he packs his things and is walking down a deserted road and soon gets to an automobile store and buys a car. He drives to his girlfriend's (video model Jennifer also seen in Omarion's "O" Video) house and she jumps up and hugs him. Night falls and as the song states he puts her to "Bed". The camera then shows him waking up in the morning with his girlfriend still asleep.He picks up his plane tickets and leaves in a taxi, leaving the car he bought at his girlfriend's house.

Remixes 
The official remix features American rappers Ja Rule and Trina, and uses the instrumental from R. Kelly's song "Number One", which itself samples Kirko Bangz's "Drank In My Cup" and RUN-DMC's "Walk This Way". The second official remix features American rapper Fabolous. The Third Remix of this song came early 2018 when "Kanye West" had a "Yeezy Season 5" Fashion show in the New York City it was later released on Soundcloud for the masses to hear 17:19 minute remix rework and completely re-done song vocals are done by "The-Dream"

Usage in media
The song appears on the episode of "Stay fierce, Malik" January 23, 2009 on The Game. The song was also used in a dance sequence by Luke James in the 2019 film Little.

Charts

Weekly charts

Year-end charts

Certifications

See also
List of number-one R&B singles of 2007 (U.S.)

References

External links
 J. Holiday Live Rooftop Show
J. Holiday Live @ HOB
J. Holiday Interview: Bringing Storytelling Back to R&B

2007 singles
2007 songs
J. Holiday songs
Capitol Records singles
Songs written by The-Dream
Song recordings produced by The-Dream